Dicerandra modesta is a species of Dicerandra endemic to the Lake Wales Ridge in Central Florida. It is a listed state and federal endangered species. It is known only from a few populations in Polk County, Florida.

References

modesta
Endemic flora of Florida